Madou is a Brussels Metro station on the northern segment of lines 2 and 6. It is located under the Small Ring (Brussels' inner ring road) at the /, near the Flemish Parliament and Madou Plaza Tower, in the municipality of the Saint-Josse-ten-Noode, north of the City of Brussels, Belgium.

The station opened on 20 December 1970, then serving as a premetro (underground tram) station, and became a heavy metro station when this line was converted on 2 October 1988. It is named after the painter and lithographer Jean-Baptiste Madou.

Brussels metro stations
Railway stations opened in 1970
Saint-Josse-ten-Noode